The Bonang River is a perennial river of the Snowy River catchment, located in the Alpine region of the Australian state of Victoria.

Course and features
Formed by the confluence of the northern and southern branches of the river, the Bonang River rises below Mountain Little Bill in a remote alpine wilderness area within the Snowy River National Park, near The Gap Scenic Reserve. The river flows generally north leaving the national park, then northwest, and then west, joined by six minor tributaries, before reaching its confluence with the Deddick River in the Victorian State Forestry country, below Mount Rosendale in the Shire of East Gippsland, south of the Black-Allan Line that forms part of the border between Victoria and New South Wales. The river descends  over its  course.

In its upper reaches, the river is traversed by Bonang Road north of the road's junction with McKillops Road.

History

Aboriginal history
The traditional custodians of the land surrounding the Bonang River are the Australian Aboriginal Bidawal and Nindi-Ngudjam Ngarigu Monero peoples.

European history

See also

 List of rivers of Australia

References

External links
 
 
 
 

East Gippsland catchment
Rivers of Gippsland (region)